Ignazia Graziella "Grace" Grace (née Farfaglia; born 12 August 1958) is an Australian politician from the state of Queensland. She has been a member of the Legislative Assembly of Queensland for the seat of McConnel and its predecessor seat, Brisbane Central, for all but two years since 2007. She is a member of the Labor Party.

Grace was born in Brisbane, Queensland, the daughter of an Italian migrant cane cutter. She was an industrial relations advisor to the Keating Government until 1995 when she was elected as assistant general secretary, and in 2000 the first female general secretary, of the Queensland Council of Unions.

Grace was elected to the Legislative Assembly at the 2007 Brisbane Central state by-election following the resignation of Premier Peter Beattie.  The Coalition did not field a candidate.  She won the seat again in the 2009 state election, despite an 8.4 percent swing to the newly merged Liberal National Party (LNP).

Grace was a notable supporter of the ALP government's decision to legislate civil partnerships for homosexual couples in Queensland. New Farm and Fortitude Valley, the main centres for Brisbane's gay community, are both in her electorate and she has built close ties with gay rights organisations.

In the 2012 state election she lost her seat to the LNP's Robert Cavallucci. She regained her seat in the 2015 Queensland state election. She was elected Deputy Speaker of the Legislative Assembly, under Peter Wellington, and was given three Ministerial portfolios in a cabinet reshuffle on 7 December 2015.

References

1958 births
Living people
Australian trade unionists
Australian politicians of Italian descent
Members of the Queensland Legislative Assembly
Australian Labor Party members of the Parliament of Queensland
Labor Right politicians
21st-century Australian politicians
21st-century Australian women politicians
Women members of the Queensland Legislative Assembly